Iolaus umbrosa is a butterfly in the family Lycaenidae. It is found in southern Somalia and eastern Kenya. The habitat consists of arid savanna.

The larvae feed on Loranthus species.

References

Butterflies described in 1886
Iolaus (butterfly)
Butterflies of Africa
Taxa named by Arthur Gardiner Butler